Deressa or Deresse is a male name of Ethiopian origin that may refer to:

Deressa Chimsa (born 1976), Ethiopia marathon runner
Deresse Mekonnen (born 1987), Ethiopian middle-distance runner and two-time world indoor champion
Yilma Deressa (1907–1979), Ethiopian former Minister for Finance and Foreign Affairs

See also
Gedeo language, also known as the Deressa language

Amharic-language names